Rodney Green (born 8 December 1985) is a Bahamian sprinter who specializes in the 100 metres.

He competed at the 2010 World Indoor Championships without reaching the final. In the 4 x 100 metres relay he won silver medals at the 2006 Central American and Caribbean Games and the 2008 Central American and Caribbean Championships.

His personal best times are 6.65 seconds in the 60 metres (indoor), achieved at the 2010 World Indoor Championships in Doha; and 10.28 seconds in the 100 metres, achieved in July 2008 in Winter Haven and June 2009 in Clermont. His 60 metres personal best was the Bahamian record at the time.

Achievements

References

1985 births
Living people
Athletes (track and field) at the 2011 Pan American Games
Bahamian male sprinters
Athletes (track and field) at the 2010 Commonwealth Games
Central American and Caribbean Games silver medalists for the Bahamas
Competitors at the 2006 Central American and Caribbean Games
Central American and Caribbean Games medalists in athletics
Commonwealth Games competitors for the Bahamas
Pan American Games competitors for the Bahamas